Henry Baker (1901 – death unknown), nicknamed "Red", was an American Negro league outfielder between 1925 and 1932.

A native of Kentucky, Baker made his Negro leagues debut in 1925 with the Indianapolis ABCs. The following season he played for the Dayton Marcos, and in 1932 he returned to Indianapolis to play with the newly organized ABCs franchise.

References

External links
 and Baseball-Reference Black Baseball Stats and Seamheads 

1901 births
Place of birth missing
Place of death missing
Date of birth missing
Year of death missing
Dayton Marcos players
Indianapolis ABCs players
Indianapolis ABCs (1931–1933) players
Baseball outfielders
Baseball players from Kentucky